Koriukivka Raion  is a raion (district) of Chernihiv Oblast, northern Ukraine. Its administrative centre is located at the town of Koriukivka. Population: 

On 18 July 2020, as part of the administrative reform of Ukraine, the number of raions of Chernihiv Oblast was reduced to five, and the area of Koriukivka Raion was significantly expanded. Two abolished raions, Snovsk and Sosnytsia Raions, as well as part of Mena Raion, were merged into Koriukivka Raion. The January 2020 estimate of the raion population was

Subdivisions

Current
After the reform in July 2020, the raion consisted of 5 hromadas:
 Kholmy settlement hromada with the administration in the urban-type settlement of Kholmy, retained from Koriukivka Raion;
 Koriukivka urban hromada with the administration in the city of Koriukivka, retained from Koriukivka Raion;
 Mena urban hromada with the administration in the city of Mena, transferred from Mena Raion;
 Snovsk urban hromada with the administration in the city of Snovsk, transferred from Snovsk Raion.
 Sosnytsia settlement hromada with the administration in the urban-type settlement of Sosnytsia, transferred from Sosnytsia Raion.

Before 2020

Before the 2020 reform, the raion consisted of two hromadas:
 Kholmy settlement hromada with the administration in Kholmy;
 Koriukivka urban hromada with the administration in Koriukivka.

References

Raions of Chernihiv Oblast
1923 establishments in Ukraine